Herman Auerbach (October 26, 1901, Tarnopol – August 17, 1942) was a Polish mathematician and member of the Lwów School of Mathematics.

Auerbach was professor at Lwów University. During the Second World War because of his Jewish descent he was imprisoned by the Germans in the Lwów ghetto. In 1942 he was murdered at Bełżec extermination camp.

See also 
Jewish ghettos in German-occupied Poland
List of Nazi-German concentration camps
The Holocaust in Poland
World War II casualties of Poland

References

External links
  Author profile in the database zbMATH

1901 births
1942 deaths
People from Ternopil
People from the Kingdom of Galicia and Lodomeria
Jews from Galicia (Eastern Europe)
Austro-Hungarian Jews
Lwów School of Mathematics
Lwów Ghetto inmates
People who died in Belzec extermination camp
Polish civilians killed in World War II
Polish people who died in Nazi concentration camps
Polish Jews who died in the Holocaust